Tobias Johansson (born 27 January 1982) is a retired Swedish footballer who played as a midfielder. His last club was Ängelholms FF.

References

External links
 

1982 births
Living people
Association football midfielders
Swedish footballers
Allsvenskan players
Superettan players
IFK Värnamo players
Ängelholms FF players
Helsingborgs IF players
Mjällby AIF players